HMS Hecate (A137) was a Royal Navy deep ocean survey vessel of the . She was present at the "presentation of fleet colours" review in Torbay on 29 July 1969. The ship was decommissioned in 1990.

History 
On 21 April 1971, two launches attached to HMS Hecate were towed out to sea and bombed by the Provisional Irish Republican Army while the vessels were moored at Baltimore, Republic of Ireland. One of the launches, Stork, was wrecked, while the other boat, Puffin, survived with minor damage. HMS Hecate was carrying out a hydrographic survey in collaboration with the government of the Republic.

In the mid-1970s HMS Hecate was in the Persian Gulf surveying the entrance areas in the event of conflicts while based in Bandar Abbas, Iran.

During the Falklands War, Hecate, unlike her sister ships, was painted grey and sent south to assume 's role as the Ice Patrol Ship.  Arriving on station after the ceasefire, Hecate conducted patrols and surveys in the South Atlantic.  Hecate visited British Antarctic Survey bases and spent Christmas in Grytviken, South Georgia, where the crew attended a candlelit Christmas mass in the settlement's old whaling church.  The New Year was spent at the Falkland Islands before Hecate became the first Royal Navy ship to visit South America following the hostilities.  Hecate embarked a Chilean pilot at Punta Arenas before sailing to Talcahuano, Chile via the Patagonian Channel.  Following a brief visit, Hecate took passage through the Panama Canal for a four-day visit to Antigua.  Hecate returned to the UK in February, 1983.

Notes

References
  Hydrographic Survey Work in the Royal Navy up to the 1980s 

 

Hecla-class survey vessels
Maritime incidents in 1971